Crexendo, Inc. is a cloud-based UCaaS communication service company. The company was founded in 1995 and is headquartered in Arizona. 

The company was formerly known by various other names, however, for the last several years, it has been known as Crexendo and currently trades on the NASDAQ as CXDO.

Crexendo has received several awards including Product of the Year awards and Excellence awards.

Managers
The CEO is Mr. Steven G. Mihaylo, the President and COO is Doug Gaylor, the CFO is Ron Vincent, the Chief Strategy Officer is Anand Butch, the CRO is John Brinton and the General Counsel is Jeff S. Korn.

References

American companies established in 2005
Companies traded over-the-counter in the United States
Companies based in Tempe, Arizona